Farm to Market Roads in Texas are owned and maintained by the Texas Department of Transportation (TxDOT).

FM 700

Farm to Market Road 700 (FM 700) is located in Howard County. It runs from Business I-20 in Big Spring to US 87 north of Big Spring.

FM 700 was designated on November 8, 1946, from US 80 (now Business I-20) west of Big Spring to the north boundary of the U.S. Air Force Training School area (later Webb Air Force Base). This route was formerly War Highway 14 from 1942 to 1946. On October 16, 1951, the road was extended east  to US 87, replacing a section of PR 8. On July 16, 1957, the road was extended east and north . On September 27, 1960, the road was extended north  to SH 350. On August 30, 1988, a  section from SH 350 west to US 87 was added.

Junction list

FM 701

FM 702

FM 703

Farm to Market Road 703 (FM 703) was located in West Texas. No highway currently uses the FM 703 designation.

FM 703 was designated on November 8, 1946, from Kermit to the Andrews County line. On May 7, 1948, the road was extended northeast  to the Dawson, Gaines, and Martin County lines. On January 27, 1949, the road was extended to Lamesa. On September 28, 1949, the road was rerouted to SH 349 at Patricia, completing its routing. On October 21, 1952, FM 703 was signed (but not designated) as part of SH 115. FM 703 was cancelled on August 29, 1990, as the SH 115 designation became official.

FM 704

Farm to Market Road 704 (FM 704) is located in Jones County. It runs from SH 6 southwest of Stamford east and north to FM 142.

FM 704 was designated on January 22, 1947, from US 380 (now SH 6) southeast of Stamford to Stamford Airport. on October 31, 1958, the road was extended east and north to FM 142, bringing the highway to its final length.

FM 705

FM 706

FM 707

Farm to Market Road 707 (FM 707) is located in Jones and Taylor counties. It runs from US 83 south of Anson to I-20 in Tye. It runs to the west of Dyess Air Force Base.

FM 707 was designated on December 10, 1946, from the east boundary of Camp Barkley east to US 83. It had been War Highway 7. On May 23, 1951, the road was extended north 12.7 miles to a junction with FM 708. On July 11, 1951, the road extended to the Jones County Line, replacing FM 708. On November 20, 1951, the road was extended to FM 605. On February 20, 1952, the road was extended north to US 83, replacing FM 1227 and creating a concurrency with FM 605. On November 24, 1959, the road was extended east  to FM 1750. On January 31, 1973, a spur connection to US 83 and US 84 was added. On June 27, 1995, the section from I-20 to FM 1750 (along with the spur connection) was redesignated Urban Road 707 (UR 707). The designation of this section reverted to FM 707 with the elimination of the Urban Road system on November 15, 2018.

Junction list

FM 708

Farm to Market Road 708 (FM 708) is located in Bosque County. It runs from FM 219 near Clifton southeast to FM 56 near Cayote.

FM 708 was designated on July 25, 1951, on the current route.

FM 708 (1946)

The original FM 708 was designated on December 10, 1946, from US 80 (now I-20) at Tye to SH 158 at Caps. On July 14, 1949, the road was extended north to the Jones County line. FM 708 was cancelled on July 11, 1951, and combined with FM 707.

FM 709

Farm to Market Road 709 (FM 709) is located in Navarro County. It runs from SH 31 in Corsicana to SH 31 west of Dawson. There is a brief concurrency with SH 31 in Dawson.

FM 709 was designated on February 20, 1947, from SH 31 at Dawson via Pickett to an intersection with SH 31 in Corsicana. On November 10, 1947, the road was extended north to a re-routed SH 31, replacing Spur 138. On October 29, 1962, the road was extended north from SH 31, creating a concurrency with SH 31 and replacing a section of FM 639. On June 1, 1965, the road was extended west and south  to its current terminus at SH 31.

FM 710

FM 711

Farm to Market Road 711 (FM 711) is located in San Augustine and Shelby counties. It runs from US 96 at San Augustine to SH 7 southwest of Center.

FM 711 was designated on May 23, 1951, from the new location of US 96 near San Augustine northwest  to a road intersection. On August 24, 1955, the road was extended northwest  to a road intersection. On October 31, 1958, the road was extended  miles to the Shelby county line. On November 28, 1958, the -mile FM 1821 was combined, extending the road to SH 7.

FM 711 (1946)

The original FM 711 was designated on December 10, 1946, from SH 139 (now SH 7) at or near Chilton to Satin. FM 711 was cancelled once it was completed.

FM 712

Farm to Market Road 712 (FM 712) is located in Falls County. The highway begins at FM 2027, crosses the Brazos River and ends at Loop 23 south of Marlin.

The continuation of the road to the southwest, which ends in Lott, is called Falls Road. There is a county park and historical marker on the east side of the bridge that commemorates Sarahville de Viesca, the short-lived capital of Robertson's Colony. FM 712 intersects with County Road 301  past the bridge where it changes direction to the northeast. The highway passes County Road 302 on the left and the William P. Hobby Unit, a state prison for women, on the right. Continuing northeast, FM 712 crosses a railroad and intersects with County Road 287. The highway is two lanes wide for its entire length.

The designation of FM 712 in its current location occurred on December 19, 1959. It was a rerouting and a renumbering of part of FM 147. On November 15, 1973, FM 712 was extended an additional  to FM 2027 at Carter Munsch Church. On November 30, 1978, the highway's designation was altered to start at FM 2027, go northeast, and end at Loop 23 (now Bus. SH 6) south of Marlin.

FM 712 (1946)

The first use of the FM 712 designation was on December 10, 1946, from FM 107 at or near Mooreville north  toward Cottonwood. This route was cancelled once it was completed.

FM 712 (1951–1958)

The next use of the FM 712 designation was on May 23, 1951, from US 81 in Itasca northeast . On December 17, 1951, the western terminus was moved to FM 66 though the highway had the same mileage. On December 17, 1952, the road was extended  to US 81. FM 712 was cancelled on November 26, 1958, and transferred to FM 67.

FM 713

FM 714

FM 715

Farm to Market Road 715 (FM 715) is located in Midland County. It runs from SH 140 south 5.3 miles to FM 1213.

FM 715 was designated on April 30, 1947, from SH 158 (now SH 140), 2 miles south of Midland, south .

FM 716

FM 717

FM 718

Farm to Market Road 718 (FM 718) is located in Tarrant and Wise counties.

The highway begins in northwestern Fort Worth in the Avondale area. FM 718's southern terminus is at US 81/US 287/Bus. US 287. The highway travels northwest through Newark, passing just east of Lake Worth. FM 718's northern terminus is at an intersection with SH 114 in Aurora.

FM 718 was designated on September 9, 1947, on the current route.

Junction list

FM 719

Farm to Market Road 719 (FM 719) is located in Karnes County. It runs from US 181 north of Kenedy east to FM 792.

FM 719 was designated on July 17, 1954, on the current route.

FM 719 (1947)

The original FM 719 was designated on September 9, 1947, from US 59, 2.5 miles east of Edna, north through Cordele at a total distance of 16 miles. On December 17, 1952, the road was extended north to the Lavaca County line. FM 719 was cancelled on January 16, 1953, and transferred to FM 530.

FM 720

Farm to Market Road 720 (FM 720) is located in Denton County.

FM 720 is a suburban road that begins at  US 380 just west of the Lincoln Park town limits. It travels southward, through Oak Point, before turning to the southeast and entering Little Elm. It merges onto eastbound El Dorado Parkway, while the Parkway westbound connects with the Lewisville Lake Toll Bridge and the city of Lake Dallas. The route continues northeast and east, as the main thoroughfare through Little Elm. In eastern Little Elm, El Dorado Parkway branches off to the north, while FM 720 continues east to its terminus at  FM 423.

FM 720 was first designated in neighboring Collin County on October 17, 1947; it replaced an old alignment of  SH 24 between  SH 289 and  US 75, connecting Frisco and McKinney. On September 9, 1955, the route was extended into Denton County, to the new alignment of SH 24 (which would become US 380 in 1977), replacing  FM 388 from SH 24 to FM 423 and portions of  FM 423 from Old SH 24 to FM 388. On June 30, 1958, the section from US 75 east to SH 5 was cancelled. The route was truncated on August 30, 2001, when the portion from FM 2478 to US 75 was mostly removed from the state highway system. On January 31, 2002, a segment in east Frisco between SH 289 and  FM 2478 was retained on the system and redesignated as FM 3537, while the section from FM 423 to SH 289 was removed from the state highway system.

FM 721

FM 722

FM 723
Farm to Market Road 723 (FM 723) is located in Fort Bend County. The highway begins at U.S. Route 90 Alternate (US 90A) and SH 36 in Rosenberg, goes directly north and ends at FM 1093 south of Katy.

FM 723 starts at the intersection of US 90A (Avenue H) and SH 36 (First Street) in Rosenberg and heads north on First Street. After one block, FM 723 crosses over multiple railroad tracks via the John H. Arredondo Bridge. Leaving the river behind, FM 723 passes through a rural landscape with an occasional subdivision. At a distance  from the start, there are three school buildings belonging to the Lamar Consolidated Independent School District on the east side of the highway. From south to north, these are Werthimer Middle School, Briscoe Junior High School and John and Randolph Foster High School. There is a state historical marker in front of the high school. After passing the schools, FM 723 intersects with FM 359 at a traffic light  from its start. After another , FM 723 ends at a traffic light at FM 1093. The continuation of the road north into a suburban area is called Spring Green Boulevard.

Junction list

FM 724

FM 725

Farm to Market Road 725 (FM 725) is located in Comal and Guadalupe counties.

FM 725 begins at an intersection with FM 467 in south Seguin, near its junction with Business SH 123. The route travels west to an intersection with SH 46 before leaving Seguin and making a dogleg to the north-northwest. Just outside the Seguin city limits, FM 725 intersects US 90 and has a junction with I-10 at its exit 604. The route has a brief concurrency with FM 78 in McQueeney before resuming a northward direction and passing Lake McQueeney before entering New Braunfels. In New Braunfels, FM 725 (known as Seguin Avenue) has a junction with I-35 at its exit 187. The FM 725 designation ends at an intersection with Business I-35/Business SH 46, the former route of US 81 in New Braunfels.

FM 725 was designated in Guadalupe County on September 9, 1947, from FM 78 in McQueeney to the Comal County line. On December 16, 1948, the designation was extended into Comal County, to US 81 in New Braunfels. The southward extension from FM 78 to US 90 occurred on December 11, 1961, replacing FM 2723. The route was lengthened to the south, to Leissner Road (the location of the current dogleg in the route west of Seguin), on January 5, 1971. The extension to the current southern terminus at FM 467 was made on November 3, 1972.

The designation indicates a break in FM 725 at FM 78; however, signage in the area indicates a concurrency.

Junction list

FM 726

Farm to Market Road 726 (FM 726) is located in Marion, Harrison and Upshur counties. It runs from FM 729 near French Creek to US 271.

FM 726 was designated on October 25, 1947, from SH 49, 3 miles northwest of Jefferson, southwest . On November 18, 1953, a  section was transferred to FM 729. On November 21, 1956, the road was extended west along the Ferrells Bridge Dam to FM 450. On September 27, 1960, the road was extended west  from FM 450 to a road intersection, creating a concurrency with FM 450. On June 28, 1963, the road was extended southwest to US 271, replacing FM 1973 and creating concurrencies with SH 154 and FM 1650.

FM 727

Farm to Market Road 727 (FM 727) is located in Marion County. It runs from SH 49 southeast of Smithland south to Caddo Lake.

FM 727 was designated on October 25, 1947, on the current route.

FM 728

Farm to Market Road 728 (FM 728) is located in Marion County. It runs from SH 49, 1.5 miles northwest of Jefferson, to Berea.

FM 728 was designated on October 25, 1947, on the current route.

FM 729

Farm to Market Road 729 (FM 729) is located in Morris and Marion counties. It runs from SH 26 at the Lone Star Steel Plant southeast to SH 49 near Jefferson.

FM 729 was designated on October 25, 1947, from FM 726 northwest of Jefferson west . On July 15, 1949, the road was extended to the new location of SH 155. On November 20, 1951, the road was extended northwest  miles to SH 26. On November 18, 1953, the road was extended southeast to SH 49, replacing a section of FM 726.

FM 730

Farm to Market Road 730 (FM 730) is a two-lane route connecting various farming areas of Montague, Wise, Parker, and Tarrant counties. FM 730 terminates at FM 455 near Forestburg in Montague County at its northern end and at US 180 in Weatherford at its southern end.

FM 730 was designated On September 9, 1947, from SH 199 at Azle to the Wise County line. On May 23, 1951, the road was extended north to SH 114 at Boyd. On February 6, 1953, the road was extended north to SH 24 (now US 380), replacing FM 1882. On November 21, 1956, the road was extended north  to a road intersection and a gap was added at Boyd. On June 2, 1967, the road was extended northeast  to a road intersection. On September 5, 1973, the road was extended northeast  to the Montague County line. On October 26, 1983, a section from FM 455 to the Wise County line was added. On December 20, 1984, the road was extended southwest to US 80 (now US 180), replacing FM 1707.

Junction list

FM 731

Farm to Market Road 731 (FM 731) runs from FM 917 just south of Burleson to Interstate 20 in southern Fort Worth.

FM 731 begins at an intersection with FM 917 south of Burleson and east of Joshua. The highway travels north to Burleson, running along the town's eastern border. FM 731 enters Crowley, intersecting with Farm to Market Road 1187 and runs through the center of town. Development along the highway becomes more sparse before entering Fort Worth at Risinger Road. FM 731 runs through a heavily developed area of the city's southside before ending at Interstate 20.

FM 731 was designated on September 9, 1947, from the then-proposed Fort Worth Southwest Loop south to Crowley. On October 26, 1950, FM 731 was extended north to US 81 at Kellis Street. On October 13, 1954, FM 731 was extended west and south to FM 917. On November 22, 1955, the section west of FM 1187 became part of FM 1187, and the section south of FM 1187 was renumbered FM 1902. On August 11, 1958, the section from I-820 (now I-20) to US 81 was cancelled. On May 6, 1964, FM 731 was extended south to FM 917, replacing FM 2233 and FM 2035. On June 27, 1995, the section SH 174 to I-20 was redesignated Urban Road 731 (UR 731). The designation of this section reverted to FM 731 with the elimination of the Urban Road system on November 15, 2018.

Junction list

FM 732

FM 733

FM 734

Farm to Market Road 734 (FM 734) is located in Travis and Williamson counties. It runs from US 290 in Austin to RM 1431 in Cedar Park.

FM/RM 734 (1947)

The original FM 734 was designated on November 18, 1947, from US 87 at Brady southeast via Voca to the Mason County line. On October 29, 1948, the road was extended southeast to FM 386 at Fredonia. On May 28, 1952, the road was extended southeast to SH 29 northwest of Llano, replacing a section of FM 386 (now RM 386). On May 22, 1958, the route was rerouted out of Voca, shortening the route by 0.1 mile. On April 30, 1959, the western terminus was relocated south of Brady and the former route was transferred to FM 2309. On March 16, 1961, FM 734 was redesignated Ranch to Market 734 (RM 734). RM 734 was cancelled on September 1, 1965, and transferred to SH 71, though signage was not changed until January 1, 1966.

FM 735

FM 736

Farm to Market Road 736 (FM 736) is located in Orange County. It runs from FM 3247 (formerly FM 1130) east 0.3 miles.

FM 736 was designated on September 27, 1960, from FM 1134 (later FM 1130, now FM 3247) east 0.3 miles.

FM 736 (1947)

The original FM 736 was designated on September 9, 1947, from Alice east to the Nueces County line. On July 14, 1949, the road was extended east  to what became part of FM 70 on May 23, 1951. FM 736 was cancelled on November 2, 1955, and transferred to FM 665, though signage was not changed until the 1956 travel map was published.

FM 737
Farm to Market Road 737 (FM 737) is a designation that has been used twice. There is currently no highway using the FM 737 designation.

FM 737 (1947–1949)

The original FM 737 was designated on September 9, 1947, from US 59 at Alfred west to US 281. The county was unable to secure the right of way for FM 737 and it was cancelled 18 months later.

FM 737 (1951–1971)

The next use of the FM 737 designation was on May 23, 1951, from FM 308 near Birome to SH 31 at Mount Calm. On November 13, 1953, the road was extended to FM 73 at Prairie Hill, replacing FM 1662 and creating a concurrency with SH 31. On December 3, 1964, the road was extended southeast to US 84, creating a concurrency with FM 73. On June 2, 1967, the road was extended northwest to FM 2114. FM 737 was cancelled on July 15, 1971, and combined with FM 339.

FM 738

FM 739

FM 739 (1947)

The first FM 739 was designated on September 9, 1947, from US 59 at Sandia southeast to the Nueces County line. FM 739 was cancelled on January 14, 1952, and transferred to FM 70.

FM 740

Farm to Market Road 740 (FM 740) is located in Kaufman and Rockwall counties.

FM 740 starts at the Kaufman-Dallas county line between Seagoville and Forney. The road continues south as Malloy Bridge Road, which runs to I-45 in Wilmer. There is no signage marking the end of FM 740, much less a sign noting the county line. FM 740 runs northeast to I-20 in the easternmost part of Mesquite. FM 740 makes two right angle turns just north of I-20. The first is at FM 548, where northbound traffic must turn right to continue on FM 740 and southbound traffic must stop. The second is about a 1/4 mile northwest of FM 548 at County Road 202.

The highway enters Forney as South Bois d' Arc Street. Near the town square 740 runs a short distance with FM 688 (an old alignment of US 80) before turning north on Pinson Road. FM 740 intersects US 80 before turning left, running out of Forney.

Entering Rockwall County, the highway enters Heath. 740 turns right at FM 1140, where the latter runs closer to the shore of Lake Ray Hubbard. FM 740 enters Rockwall, intersecting I-30 before terminating at SH 205.

FM 740 was designated on September 9, 1947, from the Rockwall County Line across US 80 to the Dallas County Line. On July 15, 1949, FM 740 was extended north to FM 550. On November 4, 1955, the section of FM 550 from FM 740 to US 67 was transferred to FM 740. On April 30, 1959, FM 740 replaced part of the old location of US 80, the rest on the east became a spur connection. The west section of old US 80 was removed from the system. On January 8, 1960, the section of FM 740 on old US 80 and FM 740 spur connection were redesignated as part of the new FM 688. On June 28, 1963, FM 740 was extended north to SH 205. On February 26, 1986, FM 740 was shifted to the west. The old route was cancelled and removed from the state highway system; this would be transferred to FM 548 in 1998. On June 27, 1995, the section from FM 1140 to SH 205 was redesignated Urban Road 740 (UR 740); the designation of this section reverted to FM 740 with the elimination of the Urban Road system on November 15, 2018. On February 22, 2018, the section from FM 688 to FM 741 was given to the city of Forney.

FM 740 in Heath is being widened from two lanes to four lanes. The 1.5-mile expansion is between FM 549 and FM 1140. The project was approved in 2012 with a budget of $12 million.

Junction list

FM 741

Farm to Market Road 741 (FM 741) begins at an interchange with U.S. Route 175 in Crandall and runs to FM 740 in Forney. The section of road in Forney is known locally as College Avenue.

FM 741 was designated on September 9, 1947, on its current route. On February 26, 1986, FM 741 was extended north from old location FM 740 (now an extension of FM 548) to new location FM 740.
Junction list

FM 742

Farm to Market Road 742 (FM 742) is located in the city of Waco and is part of  Chappel Hill Road through its length.

The highway begins at its southern terminus, Spur 484, in Waco, as a two-lane road. From there, FM 742 travels in a northeasterly direction on Chappel Hill Road, crossing over a railroad track and continuing on with businesses on the northwest side and a field on the southeast. Chappel Hill Road continues northeast for another  without the FM 742 designation, passing several homes and fields before reaching its northern terminus at Loop 340.

On May 7, 1970, FM 742 was designated on its current route in far eastern Waco.

FM 742 (1947)

The first FM 742 was designated on September 9, 1947, from FM 81, 3 miles north of Runge to a dead end point just past a junction with Karnes County Road 317. FM 742 was cancelled on December 17, 1969, and combined with FM 627.

FM 743

FM 744

FM 744 (1947)

The first FM 744 was designated on September 9, 1947, from US 181 at Hobson south . On March 31, 1948, the section from Hobson to SH 123 was added. FM 744 was cancelled on January 6, 1950, and combined with FM 81.

FM 745

FM 745 (1947)

The original FM 745 was designated on September 9, 1947, from SH 214, 9 miles south of Muleshoe, east to the Lamb County line. On December 17, 1952, the road was extended east  to US 84. FM 745 was cancelled on November 1, 1968, and combined with FM 746.

FM 746

FM 747

Farm to Market Road 747 (FM 747) is located in Cherokee County. The route serves the communities of Pierces Chapel and New Hope.

FM 747 was designated on September 9, 1947, from US 79 in Jacksonville southwest . On October 25, 1947, the route was extended southwest . The northern terminus was changed to another point on US 79 on August 29, 1957. On October 31, 1957, the route was extended  westward from US 79.

Junction list

FM 748

FM 749

Farm to Market Road 749 (FM 749) runs from SH 70 to SH 273/Loop 171 in Gray County.

Junction list

FM 750

Farm to Market Road 750 (FM 750) runs from US 60 to SH 273 in Pampa. The highway is known locally as McCullough Street.

FM 750 was designated on September 9, 1947, running from US 60 to SH 273. On January 16, 1952, a spur route was created, connecting FM 750 to another point on US 60. The spur route was extended further north to SH 152 on November 21, 1956. The spur route was cancelled on November 26, 1957, with the mileage being transferred to FM 282.

Junction list

FM 751

Farm to Market Road 751 (FM 751) starts at a junction with FM 47 in Wills Point and heads north crossing Lake Tawakoni in two places and through Hawk Cove before it comes to an end at a junction with FM 35 and SH 276 near Quinlan.

FM 751 was designated on September 9, 1947, from US 80 in Wills Point northward  to a road intersection. On December 3, 1957, FM 751 was extended north to its current end.

Junction list

FM 752

Farm to Market Road 752 (FM 752) is located in central Cherokee County.

Junction list

FM 753

Farm to Market Road 753 (FM 753) is located near Athens in eastern Texas.

The highway was first designated on October 25, 1947, running from SH 31 to FM 59. On December 17, 1952, the highway was extended further east to its current eastern terminus at SH 19.

FM 753 begins at an intersection with SH 31 in Crescent Heights, between Malakoff and Athens. The highway runs south before making a nearly 90 degree turn near County Road 1205, running in a more eastward direction. FM 753 has an intersection with FM 59 and turns northeast at County Road 1108. The highway has an intersection with RM 2970 and turns more into a northward direction before ending at an intersection with SH 19.

Junction list

FM 754

FM 755

FM 756

Farm to Market Road 756 (FM 756) is located in Smith County. It runs from FM 346 south to FM 344.

FM 756 was designated on September 9, 1947, from SH 110 near the south city limits of Tyler south to FM 346 west of Whitehouse. On July 14, 1949, the road was extended south  to FM 344. On June 27, 1995, the section from Loop 323 to FM 346 was redesignated Urban Road 756 (UR 756). The designation of this section reverted to FM 756 with the elimination of the Urban Road system on November 15, 2018.

FM 757

Farm to Market Road 757 (FM 757) runs from SH 31 to FM 16 at Starrville in Smith County.

FM 757 begins at an intersection with SH 31 in Smith County, where the road continues south as CR 21 (Red Bird Road). From this intersection, the route heads north on a two-lane undivided road, heading through wooded areas with some small fields and homes. The highway crosses FM 2767 and continues through more rural areas. FM 757 heads into a mix of farmland and woodland as it comes to an interchange with I-20. Past this interchange, the road runs between farms to the west and woods to the east, intersecting the western terminus of FM 1252 before crossing US 271. FM 757 runs through more agricultural and wooded areas, ending at an intersection with FM 16 in Starrville.

The route (former War Highway 17) was designated on September 9, 1947, from US 271 to SH 31. On October 29, 1948, FM 757 was extended  from Starrville to US 271. The final change came on June 28, 1963, when FM 757 was extended to a rerouted SH 31, bringing FM 757 to its current configuration.

FM 758

FM 759

FM 760

FM 760 (1947)

The original FM 760 was designated on December 17, 1947, from FM 759 at or near Spearman south to the Hutchinson County line. FM 760 was cancelled on October 28, 1948, and combined with FM 279. In 1949, FM 279 was rerouted off of this road, and this road was redesignated as FM 760 again.

FM 761

Farm to Market Road 761 (FM 761) was located in Reeves County. The  route began at SH 17 and followed city streets within the city of Pecos in Reeves County ending at Business Interstate 20-B (Bus. I-20-B).

FM 761 began at SH 17 and followed southeast along Stafford Boulevard, a two-lane street, passing Reeves County Hospital before turning northeast onto South Eddy Street. At that point it became a mixed residential and commercial five-lane street including a center left-turn lane. Beyond West Walthall Street, the route turned toward the northwest passing the Pecos Technical Training Center of Odessa College. Beyond West 7th Street the roadway became a three-lane street with a left-turn lane before terminating at Bus. I-20-B.

FM 761 was designated on January 27, 1948, as a  highway from SH 17 along its current path on Stafford Boulevard and Eddy Street terminating at 8th Street. The route was extended to Bus. I-10-B on August 26, 1989. FM 761 was decommissioned on July 30, 2020, and the road was given to the city of Pecos.

FM 762

Farm to Market Road 762 (FM 762) is located in Fort Bend County. The highway begins at FM 1462 south of Brazos Bend State Park, zig-zags in a northerly direction, crosses I-69/US 59 at exit 101, and ends at US 90 Alternate in Richmond.

FM 762 begins at a stop sign on FM 1462. At the intersection, southbound traffic on FM 762 can use a right-hand curve to access FM 1462 going west. From the state park, FM 762 heads north, west, north and northwest for  before reaching a three-way junction with FM 1994. In the northwesterly stretch, the highway crosses Big Creek and passes under electric transmission lines. At the intersection, FM 762 turns sharply to the northeast, then northwest, then northeast again before passing the George Ranch and curving to the north-northwest. The highway passes the George Ranch High School of the Lamar Consolidated Independent School District before crossing the BNSF Railway tracks and arriving at a stoplight-controlled intersection with FM 2759. At the intersection, FM 762 turns sharply left and parallels the BNSF tracks to the west-northwest for  before coming to a stoplight at FM 2977. There are shopping centers on the west side of the highway on both sides of I-69/US 59, which is locally called the Southwest Freeway. I-69/US 59 may be accessed in both directions via entrance ramps on the east side of FM 762. The George Memorial Library is located on the east side of the intersection. From FM 1640, the highway continues  nearly north to the stoplight on US 90A at Jackson Street. There is also a spur connection which turns east onto Austin Street for several blocks, then north on Second Street to terminate at the west end of the Brazos River bridge on US 90A.

FM 762 was designated on December 17, 1947, to start from US 59 at Richmond, go first to Crabb and then south to the Tadpole Road in the direction of Long Point. The end location was at the 2013 site of the intersection of FM 762 and FM 1994. On July 22, 1949, FM 762 was extended  toward Long Point.

On October 10, 1961, the last  segment of the highway going northeast from Damon was transferred to FM 1462. On August 27, 1963, a  spur connection in Richmond was made by routing the highway east on Austin Street and north on South 2nd Street to US 59 (now US 90A).

FM 763

FM 764

FM 765

FM 766

FM 767

FM 768

Farm to Market Road 768 (FM 768) is located in north-central Cherokee County.

On April 21, 1958, FM 854 was cancelled and its mileage was added to FM 768, extending it to Rusk.

FM 769

Farm to Market Road 769 (FM 769), also known as State Line Road, is located in Yoakum and Cochran counties. The  road runs along the New Mexico state line in Yoakum and Cochran counties from  SH 83 near Denver City to  SH 125 near Bledsoe and passes through the small community of Bronco. The road has intersections with  US 82,  US 380, and  FM 1585. FM 769 was formerly part of a much longer route that included the current SH 125 and was unofficially signed as SH 125 for several decades.

FM 769 begins at SH 83 near the point where SH 83 crosses the New Mexico state line and meets  NM 132 west of Denver City in southwestern Yoakum County. FM 769 continues northward closely following the state line and crossing US 82 southwest of Plains. The road continues north along the state link intersecting US 380 at Bronco northwest of Plains before crossing into Cochran County. The road then intersects FM 1585 before the road ends at SH 125 near the point where SH 125 meets  NM 125 southwest of Bledsoe. FM 769 passes through mostly agricultural lands and oil and gas fields across the largely flat and featureless terrain of the Llano Estacado.

FM 769 was designated on November 18, 1947, from SH 290 (now SH 114) at Whiteface to SH 214 in Lehman. On October 18, 1948, the road was extended north  to SH 24 (now SH 114), replacing Spur 74. On December 17, 1952, the road was extended south  along the New Mexico state line to a road intersection.

On March 30, 1955, FM 769 was signed (but not designated) as SH 125 as it connected with NM 125 at the state line. On November 2, 1955, the section from SH 116 (now SH 114) near Whiteface south to FM 301 was transferred to FM 1780. On May 2, 1962, the road was extended south  to US 380. On May 25, 1962, the road was extended south  to FM 1077 (now US 82), replacing FM 2010. The route was extended  farther south along the state line to SH 83 west of Denver City on January 26, 1969.

The SH 125 state highway designation became official on August 29, 1990, and the FM 769 designation was erroneously eliminated. However, this was corrected so that only the portion east of the state line became SH 125.

Junction list

FM 770

FM 771

FM 772

FM 773

FM 774

FM 775

FM 776

FM 777

FM 778

FM 779

FM 780

FM 781

Farm to Market Road 781 (FM 781) was located in Andrews County. It is now SH 128.

FM 782

RM 783

Ranch to Market Road 783 (RM 783) is located in the Texas Hill Country.

RM 783 begins in Kerrville at an intersection with SH 27 (Junction Highway). RM 783 runs through west Kerrville and is known locally as Harper Road. The highway leaves the city just north of Holdsworth Drive and crosses Interstate 10 shortly thereafter. Just after crossing Interstate 10, RM 783 passes near the corporate office of James Avery Craftsman. The highway runs through rural and hilly areas of Kerr and Gillespie counties before arriving in the town of Harper, sharing an overlap with U.S. Route 290. After leaving the town, RM 783 runs through more hilly and rural areas of Gillespie County before entering Mason County, ending at an intersection with U.S. Route 87 southeast of Mason.

RM 783 was designated on May 7, 1948, as Farm to Market Road 783 (FM 783), from US 290 in Harper to SH 27 in Kerrville. On October 28, 1953, FM 783 was extended northeast . On September 28, 1954, FM 783 was extended north to FM 648 at Doss and changed to RM 783. On October 1, 1956, RM 783 was extended north to US 87, replacing a portion of FM 648, which was redesignated as RM 648 that same day.

Junction list

FM 784

FM 785

FM 785 was designated on November 21, 1956, from FM 251 north to FM 74 in Queen City. On June 26, 1967, FM 785 was extended south to FM 249 over old location FM 251.

FM 785 (1948–1953)

FM 785 was first designated in 1948, running from SH 207 east  to the Cedar Hill School in Floyd County. On December 17, 1952, the highway was extended northeast  to a road intersection. This FM 785 was cancelled on December 2, 1953, with the mileage being transferred to FM 97.

FM 785 (1954)

FM 785 was designated again on October 13, 1954, running from FM 130 to FM 1399. This designation was cancelled on November 21, 1956, with the mileage being transferred to FM 995, with the FM 785 designation being reused on its current route in the same county.

FM 786

FM 787

Farm to Market Road 787 (FM 787) is located in Liberty and Hardin counties. It runs from SH 105/SH 321 in Cleveland to FM 770 in Saratoga.

FM 787 was designated on June 2, 1947, from SH 146 near Rye via Votaw to Saratoga. On December 21, 1984, the road was extended to SH 321 in Cleveland along an old routing of SH 105 after it was routed on top of FM 162.

FM 787 (proposed 1948)

This FM 787 was proposed on May 7, 1948, from Lockney northward to Lone Star School. This FM 787 was never implemented, and was instead designated as a second section of FM 598 (now FM 378).

FM 788

FM 789

Farm to Market Road 789 (FM 789) is located in Lubbock and Hale counties.

FM 789 begins at an intersection with FM 40 near Acuff. The highway travels north before sharing an overlap with US 62/US 82/SH 114 between Idalou and Ralls. Leaving the concurrency, FM 789 continues to run north before entering the town of Petersburg, where the highway has a short overlap with FM 54. Leaving its overlap with FM 54, the highway runs north through rural areas of eastern Hale County before reaching its northern terminus at US 70 between Plainview and Lockney.

FM 789 was designated on May 7, 1948, from US 70 southward and eastward  to a road intersection south of Bellview School. On December 2, 1953, FM 789 was extended south to 1 mile west of Estacado, replacing FM 1314. On October 31, 1957, FM 789 was extended south to US 62. On July 28, 1959, FM 789 was rerouted  to the west, so that the section from FM 1527's previous end west 1 mile was transferred to FM 1527, the section from FM 1527 to US 62 was cancelled, and FM 789 was rerouted south on a road 1 mile west of the previous road. On May 5, 1966, FM 789 was extended south to FM 40.

Junction list

FM 790

FM 791

FM 792

FM 793

Farm to Market Road 793 (FM 793) is located in Fabens. It is known locally as Fabens Road.

FM 793 begins at FM 76, a few blocks northeast of that route's intersection with SH 20. The highway travels northeast through Fabens, passing near the Fabens Airport, before ending at I-10.

FM 793 was designated on October 31, 1958, along its current route.

FM 793 (1948–1950)

FM 793 was previously designated in Gonzales County on June 1, 1948, running from SH 200 east to Nickel. This route was cancelled on April 28, 1950, and its mileage was transferred to FM 532.

FM 794

FM 795

FM 796

FM 797

FM 798

FM 799

Notes

References

+07
Farm to market roads 0700
Farm to Market Roads 0700